Slanchev Bryag Cove is the 2.05 km wide cove indenting for 1.7 km the south coast of Coronation Island in the South Orkney Islands, Antarctica. It is entered east of Saunders Point and west of Tophet Point, and surmounted by Mount Sladen to the northeast and Tophet Bastion to the east.

The cove is "named after the freezer vessel Slanchev Bryag of the Bulgarian company Ocean Fisheries – Burgas whose ships operated in the waters of South Georgia, Kerguelen, the South Orkney Islands, South Shetland Islands and Antarctic Peninsula from 1970 to the early 1990s.  The Bulgarian fishermen, along with those of the Soviet Union, Poland and East Germany are the pioneers of modern Antarctic fishing industry."

Location
British mapping in 1963.

Maps
 British Antarctic Territory: South Orkney Islands. Scale 1:100000 topographic map. DOS Series 510. Surrey, England: Directorate of Overseas Surveys, 1963
 Antarctic Digital Database (ADD). Scale 1:250000 topographic map of Antarctica. Scientific Committee on Antarctic Research (SCAR). Since 1993, regularly upgraded and updated

Notes

References
 Slanchev Bryag Cove. SCAR Composite Gazetteer of Antarctica

External links
 Slanchev Bryag Cove. Copernix satellite image

 

Coves of the South Orkney Islands
Ocean Fisheries – Burgas Co
Bulgaria and the Antarctic